The 1996 ARFU Asian Rugby Championship was the 15th edition  of the tournament, and was played in Taipei. The 8 teams were divided in two pools, with finals between the winners of each pool. Singapore withdrew and Japan won the tournament.

Tournament

Pool 1

Pool 2

Finals

Third Place Final

First Place final

See also
 List of sporting events in Taiwan

References

1996
1996 rugby union tournaments for national teams
rugby union
International rugby union competitions hosted by Taiwan
1996 in Asian rugby union